Xylomya terminalis is a species of fly in the family Xylomyidae.

Distribution
United States.

References

Xylomyidae
Diptera of North America
Insects described in 1977